Kavacham may refer to:
 Kavacham (1992 film), an Indian Malayalam-language film
 Kavacham (2018 film), an Indian Telugu-language action thriller film